Undercurrent is a 2010 Icelandic drama film based on a play by the same name and produced by the theatre group Vesturport. The film won the Best Picture award at the 2011 Edda Awards in Iceland. It tells the story of the crew of a fishing boat, one of whom commits suicide.

Cast and characters
 Ingvar E. Sigurðsson as Skipper Anton
 Nína Dögg Filippusdóttir as Drífa
 Björn Hlynur Haraldsson as Logi
 Gísli Örn Garðarsson as Benni
 Ólafur Darri Ólafsson as Sævar
 Ólafur Egilsson as Kiddi
 Víkingur Kristjánsson as Jón Geir

References

External links
 

2010 films
2010s Icelandic-language films
2010 drama films
Icelandic drama films